Poimenesperus tessmanni is a species of beetle in the family Cerambycidae. It was described by Hintz in 1919.

References

tessmanni
Beetles described in 1919